Suomen Talvisota 1939–1940 was a provocative Finnish rock band in the years 1969 and 1970. Their only album is called Underground-Rock. Lyrics for the band were provided under pseudonyms by M.A. Numminen and the Turku poets Markku Into (under the pseudonym Taannehtiva Seuralainen) and Jarkko Laine (under the pseudonym Lauri Kenttä, a reference to Superman's alter ego, Clark Kent). The name of the band literally means "The Finnish Winter War 1939-1940". They are widely considered a founding band of Finnish rock music, starting the careers of Numminen and Rauli Badding Somerjoki, influencing artists such as Juice Leskinen, and even serving as early precursors to the Finnish punk scene.

Line-up
 M.A. Numminen (under the pseudonyms Oriveden kenkätehdas, E. Väline, Ruotsin Kuningas, La Kamarado)
 Rauli Somerjoki (under the pseudonyms G.A. Johanssonin Perikunta, V. Esine)
 Pentti Aho
 Arto Koskinen
 Heikki Kasari
 Rauli "Pole" Ojanen (under the pseudonym Erik af Venusberg)
 Timo Aarniala (a visual artist)

Other personnel on the album
 Tarmo Manni (Kosminen Nauraja)
 Antero Jakoila
 Ronnie Österberg
 Paroni Paakkunainen
 Heikki Kasari
 Tommi Parko
 Mamba Koskinen
 Kikke Bergholm
 Matti Bergström
 Matti Oiling
 Raikka Rautarinne

Albums discography
 Underground-Rock (1970)

External links
Suomen Talvisota 1939-1940 @ pHinnWeb

Finnish musical groups